Ton Sak Yai National Park is a national park in Nam Pat, Tha Pla, Thong Saen Khan and Mueang Uttaradit districts in Uttaradit Province, Thailand, it was formerly known as Khlong Tron National Park.

Geography
The park's area is 324,240 rai ~  and neighbouring Lam Nam Nan National Park and Nam Pat Wildlife Sanctuary to the north, abutting Phu Miang-Phu Thong Wildlife Sanctuary to the east and neighbouring Khao Yai-Khao Na Pha Thong & Khao Ta Phrom non-hunting area to the west. It is a high and a low mountain range, such as Khao Chan, Khao Daet, Khao Khwam Ruea,  Khao Mai Pha, Khao Nam Yoi, Khao Ngai Ruea, Khao Phak Khwang, Khao Sam Liam, Khao Tak Bon, Khao Thanon, Khao Yuak and Khao Phu Miang is with  the highest. The park's streams feed the Nan River.

Climate
Ton Sak Yai National park has a tropical savanna climate (Köppen climate classification category Aw), which is divided into three seasons. The rainy or southwest mansoon season, with hot weather from May until September. Winter or northeast mansoon season, with cold weather from October until February. Summer or pre-mansoon season, from March until April.

History
In December 1990, a survey was set up in the Khlong Tron National Forest Reserve in Mueang Uttaradit and Nam Pat districts of Uttaradit province. The name was "Khlong Tron National park". On November 8, 1994, a draft decree was proposed to establish a national park, including Nam Pat Forest, Pak Huay Chalong Forest, Huay Sisead Forest, Khlong Tron Fang Khwa Forest and Khong Tron Fang Say Forest. On July 12, 2012, the name of the park was changed to "Ton Sak Yai National Park", after the 1500 year old teak tree with a circumference of 10 meters.

Flora
The park features forest types, including hill evergreen forest, coniferous forest, tropical evergreen forest, dry evergreen forest, mixed deciduous forest and dry dipterocarp forest. 
Plants species include:

Fauna
Mammals in the park are:

Birds, the park has some 60 species, of which some 40 species of passerine from 22 families, represented by one species:

and some 20 species of non-passerine from 14 families, represented by one species:

Places

Location

See also
 List of national parks in Thailand
 List of Protected Areas Regional Offices of Thailand

References

National parks of Thailand
Geography of Uttaradit province
Tourist attractions in Uttaradit province
2003 establishments in Thailand
Protected areas established in 2003